Carrie Adeline Barbour (October 1, 1861 – June 9, 1942) was an American paleontologist and educator. As an assistant curator of paleontology at the University of Nebraska State Museum and an Assistant Professor of Paleontology, Barbour was among the earliest women paleontologists in the United States.

Biography

Early life
One of Adeline (Hinkley) and Samuel Williamson Barbour's five children, Carrie Adeline Barbour was born in Springfield, Indiana, on October 1, 1861, five years after her brother, Erwin H. Barbour.  She grew up near Oxford, Ohio, and, as a child, became interested in art and science while sketching and collecting items for her mother's herbarium.

Education
Carrie Barbour studied at Oxford Female College 1886–1887, but the Oxford Female College Bulletin from the year of her studies does not indicate she attended or graduated as a college-level student.

Career
Before becoming a paleontologist, Barbour taught art at Iowa College in Grinnell, Iowa, and, in 1892, at the University of Nebraska in Lincoln, Nebraska. Although woodcarving and art remained an interest throughout her life, Barbour's career shifted to focus on paleontology in 1893, when she became assistant curator of paleontology at the University of Nebraska State Museum. She may have been the first woman employed and paid as a paleontologist in the United States

Barbour participated in field work and, back at the museum, prepared both vertebrate and invertebrate fossils. At the seventh annual meeting of the Nebraska Academy of Sciences in December 1896, she presented the paper, "Some Methods of Collecting, Preserving, and Studying Fossils," which offered approaches for handling disintegrated specimens

Carrie Barbour was among the six members of the sixth annual Morrill Geological Expedition in 1897. That year the expedition focused on sites in South Dakota, western Nebraska, and Wyoming and included work in Nebraska's Daemonelix beds. During the 1899 Morrill expedition, she led assistants collecting invertebrate fossils in Carboniferous exposures. They collected over 20,000 specimens that summer.

In 1912 she was appointed as Assistant Professor of Paleontology at the University of Nebraska.

Death 
Carrie Barbour died June 9, 1942. She is buried in Wyuka Cemetery in Lincoln, Nebraska.

Published works
Barbour, Carrie Adeline, "Report on the Work of the Morrill Geological Expeditions of the University of Nebraska" (1900). Papers in the Earth and Atmospheric Sciences. 52.

References

External links
 Erwin H. Barbour Collection at the University of Nebraska-Lincoln
 Photographs in the Erwin H. Barbour Collection at the University of Nebraska-Lincoln
 Profile on Great Nebraska Naturalists and Scientists

1861 births
1942 deaths
American paleontologists
Women paleontologists